The 1984 Belgian motorcycle Grand Prix was the ninth round of the 1984 Grand Prix motorcycle racing season. It took place on the weekend of 6–8 July 1984 at the Circuit de Spa-Francorchamps. The race was marred by the fatal accident of rider Kevin Wrettom in practice leading up to the race.

Classification

500 cc

References

Belgian motorcycle Grand Prix
Belgian
Motorcycle Grand Prix
Belgian motorcycle Grand Prix